Ádám Kovács (born 14 April 1991) is a Hungarian professional footballer who plays for Sényő in the Nemzeti Bajnokság III.

External links
 HLSZ 
 MLSZ 

1991 births
Living people
Footballers from Budapest
Hungarian footballers
Association football forwards
Oud-Heverlee Leuven players
Budapest Honvéd FC II players
Nyíregyháza Spartacus FC players
Vasas SC players
Kecskeméti TE players
Debreceni VSC players
Nyírbátori FC players
Soproni VSE players
Győri ETO FC players
Balmazújvárosi FC players
Zalaegerszegi TE players
Mosonmagyaróvári TE 1904 footballers
Békéscsaba 1912 Előre footballers
Challenger Pro League players
Nemzeti Bajnokság I players
Hungarian expatriate footballers
Expatriate footballers in Belgium
Hungarian expatriate sportspeople in Belgium